This is a list of notable Xhosa people.

Kings 

 King Maxhoba Sandile, Aa! Zanesizwe! - King of the Rharhabe sub-group of the Xhosa nation in Mngqesha Great Palace, King William's Town.
 King Zwelonke Sigcawu, Aa! Zwelonke! - King of the Xhosa nation in Nqadu Great Palace, Willowvale.
 King Buyelekhaya Dalindyebo, Aa! Zwelibanzi! - King of the abaThembu in Bumbane Great Place, Mthatha.
 King Sabata Dalindyebo, Aa! Jonguhlanga! - King of the abaThembu and father to Buyelekhaya.
 King Zwelenkosi Matanzima, Aa! Zwelenkosi! - King of Western Thembu in Qamata Great Place, Cofimvaba.
 King Ngubengcuka, Aa! Ndaba! - Great King of abaThembu and great-grandfather of Nelson Mandela.

Princes and Princesses 
 Zolile Burns-Ncamashe, AmaGwali Prince
 Emma Sandile, AmaRharhabe Princess

Chiefs

 Chief Sipho Mangindi Burns-Ncamashe
 Chief Bhurhu kaKhawuta
 Chief Langa kaPhalo
 Chief Justice Thandathu Jongilizwe Mabandla
 Chief Malashe ka Khawuta
 Chief Mandla Mandela, grandson of Nelson Mandela
 Chief Alphin Mbuso Mqalo
 Chief Falo Mgudlwa
 Chief Ngqeno ka Langa

Religious leaders 

 John Knox Bokwe
 Mvume Dandala
 James Mata Dwane
 Makhanda
 Enoch Mgijima
 Malusi Mpumlwana
 Peter Mtuze
 Zithulele Patrick Mvemve
 Sitembele Mzamane
 Njongonkulu Ndungane
 Mlibo Ngewu
 Nongqawuse
 Nontetha Nkwenkwe
 Ntsikana
 Ebenezer Ntlali
 Walter Rubusana
 Tiyo Soga
 Desmond Tutu
 Mpho Tutu van Furth
 Nomalizo Leah Tutu

Academics, scientists and business people 
 Hlumelo Biko
 Nonkululeko Gobodo
 Mhlobo Jadezweni
 Nomgcobo Jiba
 AC Jordan
 Phyllis Ntantala-Jordan
 Prudence Nobantu Mabele
 Mbuyiseli Madlanga
 Sindiwe Magona
 Vuyokazi Mahlati
 Archie Mafeje
 Cecilia Makiwane
 Thembekile Kimi Makwetu
 Makaziwe Mandela
 Makgatho Mandela
 Ndaba Mandela
 Ndileka Mandela 
 Zenani Mandela
 Zindzi Mandela (19602020)
 Evelyn Mase
 Mandisa Maya
 Bongani Mayosi
 Abigail Mbalo-Mokoena, chef and restaurateur
 Thando Mgqolozana
 Nonkosi Mhlantla
 Mandisa Monakali
 Lex Mpati
 Dali Mpofu
 Sizwe Mpofu-Walsh
 Peter Mtuze
 Godfrey Mzamane
 Joab Mzamane
 Mbulelo Mzamane
 Bongani Ndodana-Breen
 Andile Ngcaba
 Tembeka Ngcukaitobi
 Dora Nginza
 Wiseman Nkuhlu
 Terence Mncedisi Nombembe
 Loyiso Nongxa
 Dumisa Ntsebeza
 Barney Pityana
 Thembile Skweyiya
 Mvuyo Tom
 Zukisa Tshiqi
 Siyabulela Xuza

Military and warriors 

 Bhurhu kaKhawuta
 Patrick Duze
 Fumanekile Gqiba
 Nomonde Gogi-Gumede
 Hintsa kaKhawuta, Aa! Zanzolo!
 Malashe ka Khawuta
 Maqoma kaNgqika, Aa! Jongumsobomvu!
 Makhanda
 Qaqambile Matanzima
 Themba Matanzima
 Duma Mdutyana
 Derrick Mgwebi
 Bubele Mhlana
 Luvuyo Nobanda
 Butana Almond Nofomela
 Sandile kaNgqika, Aa! Mgolombane!
 Sarili kaHintsa, Aa! Krili!
 Mbombini Molteno Sihele
 Lindile Yam

Politicians and activists 

 Ngconde Balfour
 Nosimo Balindlela
 Nqaba Bhanga
 Steve Biko
 Nomandla Bloem
 Mongameli Bobani
 Thozamile Botha
 Nomkhitha Boto-Mashinini
 Fort Calata
 James Calata
 Nosipho Dastile
 Welcome Duru
 Pumza Dyantyi
 Richard Dyantyi
 Mncedisi Filtane
 Fundile Gade
 Mluleki George
 Sindiswa Gomba
 John Gomomo
 Matthew Goniwe
 Joe Nzingo Gqabi
 Oupa Gqozo
 Alcott Skei Gwentshe
 The Gugulethu Seven
 Chris Hani
 Bantu Holomisa
 Patekile Holomisa
 Davidson Don Tengo Jabavu
 John Tengo Jabavu
 Mac Jack
 Mkhuseli Jack
 Mazibuko Jara
 Irvin Jim
 Mcebisi Jonas
 Pallo Jordan
 Milner Langa Kabane
 Noxolo Kiviet
 Nkosiphendule Kolisile
 Ncumisa Chwayita Kondlo
 Ayanda Kota
 Nqabayomzi Kwankwa
 Lennox Lagu
 Zingiswa Losi
 Andile Lungisa
 Nomfunelo Mabedla
 Phakamile Mabija
 Patrick Mabilo
 Oscar Mabuyane
 Saki Macozoma
 Babalo Madikizela
 Bonginkosi Madikizela
 Winnie Madikizela-Mandela
 Ben Mafani
 Vusumzi Make
 Cecilia Makiwane
 Clarence Makwetu
 Pemmy Majodina
 Richard Majola
 Zollie Malindi
 Nelson Mandela, first president of South Africa
 Siphokazi Mani-Lusithi
 Gwede Mantashe
 Nosiviwe Mapisa-Nqakula
 Thandiswa Marawu
 Phumulo Masualle
 George Matanzima
 Kaiser Matanzima
 Qaqambile Matanzima
 Themba Matanzima
 Mangaliso Matika
 Florence Matomela
 Chumani Maxwele
 Moses Mayekiso
 Fikile Mbalula
 Govan Mbeki, father of Thabo Mbeki
 Moeletsi Mbeki, young brother of Thabo Mbeki
 Monwabisi Kwanda Mbeki, son of Thabo Mbeki
 Thabo Mbeki, second president of South Africa
 Baleka Mbete
 Nomafrench Mbombo
 A.P. Mda
 Membathisi Mdladlana
 Nomakhosazana Meth
 Nomaindia Mfeketo
 Z.F. Mgcawu
 Raymond Mhlaba, first premier of the Eastern Cape
 Sicelo Mhlauli
 Clarence Mini
 Vuyisile Mini
 Sparrow Mkhonto
 Wilton Mkwayi
 Masizole Mnqasela
 Mandisa Monakali
 Oscar Mpetha
 Loyiso Mpumlwana
 Alfred Mtsi
 Mlungisi Mvoko
 Griffiths Mxenge
 Victoria Mxenge
 Godfrey Mzamane
 Mbulelo Mzamane
 Mnikelo Ndabankulu
 Stella Ndabeni-Abrahams
 Bicks Ndoni
 Andile Ngcaba
 Bulelani Ngcuka
 Smuts Ngonyama
 Dora Nginza
 Looksmart Khulile Ngudle
 Nomantu Nkomo-Ralehoko
 Gugile Nkwinti
 Duma Nokwe
 Sam Nolutshungu
 Charles Nqakula
 Xolile Nqatha
 Stanley Ntapane
 Thembeni Nxangisa
 Thulas Nxesi
 Alfred Nzo
 Pebco Three
 Zamuxolo Peter
 Sabelo Phama
 Vusi Pikoli
 Barney Pityana
 John Nyathi Pokela
 Mzonke Poni
 Mlibo Qoboshiyane
 Christine Qunta
 Robert Resha
 Walter Rubusana
 Madoda Sambatha
 Charles Sebe
 Lennox Sebe
 Archie Sibeko
 Letitia Sibeko
 Annie Silinga
 Albertina Sisulu
 Lindiwe Sisulu
 Max Sisulu
 Walter Sisulu
 Zwelakhe Sisulu
 Stone Sizani
 TD Mweli Skota
 Mcebisi Skwatsha
 Zola Skweyiya
 Robert Sobukwe
 Tiyo Soga
 Mbulelo Sogoni
 Buyelwa Sonjica
 Makhenkesi Stofile
 Isaac Bangani Tabata
 Dora Tamana
 Adelaide Tambo
 Dali Tambo
 Oliver Tambo
 Bulelwa Tinto
 Pamela Tshwete
 Steve Tshwete
 Desmond Tutu
 Nomalizo Leah Tutu
 Moses Twebe
 Zwelinzima Vavi
 Zolile Williams
 Fikile Xasa
 Tokozile Xasa
 Lulu Xingwana
 Alfred Xuma
 Yoliswa Yako
 Tony Yengeni
 Vuyolwethu Zungula

Artists and writers 

 Tshawe Baqwa
 Bala Brothers
 Amanda Black
 John Knox Bokwe
 Busiswa
 Simphiwe Dana
 Lulu Dikana
 Zonke Dikana
 Welcome Duru
 Johnny Mbizo Dyani
 Nofinishi Dywili
 Emtee 
 Ami Faku
 Brenda Fassie
 Dumile Feni
 Mongezi Feza
 William Wellington Gqoba
 Mongezi Gum
 Mpura
 iFani
 John Tengo Jabavu
 Noni Jabavu
 Mhlobo Jadezweni
 Ayanda Jiya
 A.C. Jordan
 Milner Langa Kabane
 Atandwa Kani
 John Kani
 Gibson Kente
 Ayanda Mabulu
 Ringo Madlingozi
 Fikile Magadlela
 Sindiwe Magona
 Mzi Mahola
 Zolani Mahola
 Miriam Makeba
 Zoleka Mandela
 Billy Mandindi
 Mildred Mangxola
 Nathi Mankayi
 John Matshikiza
 Pumeza Matshikiza
 Todd Matshikiza
 Thandiswa Mazwai
 Nobesuthu Mbadu
 Margaret M'cingana Singana
 Zakes Mda
 Nontsizi Mgqwetho
 Gladys Mgudlandlu
 Gcina Mhlophe
 Anatii Mogweni
 Samuel Edward Krune Mqhayi
 Peter Mtuze
 Godfrey Mzamane
 Mbulelo Mzamane
 Bongani Ndodana-Breen
 Winston Mankunku Ngozi
 Zim Ngqawana
 Tats Nkonzo
 Nomfusi
 Victor Ntoni
 Siphiwo Ntshebe
 Makaya Ntshoko
 Winston Ntshona
 Mamela Nyamza
 Nia Pearl
 George Pemba
 R.L. Peteni
 Sol Phenduka
 Dudu Pukwana
 Percy Qoboza
 Walter Rubusana
 Moonchild Sanelly
 Ncedile Saule
 Mbombini Molteno Sihele
 Mkhanyiseli Siwahla
 Tiyo Soga
 The Soil
 Enoch Sontonga
 Samthing Soweto
 Benjamin Tyamzashe
 Andile Yenana
 Zahara
 Zanda Zakuza
 Nicholas Hlobo

Athletes 

 Lusapho April
 Zingisa April
 Lukhanyo Am
 Jonathan Armogam
 Lennox Bacela
 Lusanda Badiyana
 Mlungisi Bali (19902018)
 Brian Baloyi
 Masixole Banda
 Temba Bavuma
 Thembelani Bholi
 Chumani Booi
 Siyabonga Booi
 Mbulelo Botile
 Vuyani Bungu
 Siphamandla Dapo
 Tim Dlulane
 Aphiwe Dyantyi
 Mzo Dyantyi
 Thembinkosi Fanteni
 Aphelele Fassi
 Dumile Feni
 Myolisi Fumba
 Ludumo Galada
 Siphelele Gasa
 Lungile Gongqa
 Lungelo Gosa
 Lizo Gqoboka
 Andile Jali
 Sinethemba Jantjie (19892019)
 Bhongolwethu Jayiya
 Andile Jho
 Somila Jho
 Anaso Jobodwana
 Nkosinathi Joyi
 Ntando Kebe
 Siya Kolisi
 Steve Komphela
 Lubabalo Kondlo
 Watu Kobese
 Luxolo Koza
 Simphiwe Khonco
 Siphamandla Krweqe
 Cecil Lolo (19882015)
 Sisanda Magala
 Sylvian Mahuza
 Dumisa Makalima
 Masibulele Makepula
 Thulani Malinga
 Kaya Malotana
 Luvo Manyonga
 Makazole Mapimpi
 Masonwabe Maseti
 Simphiwe Matanzima
 Pumelela Matshikwe
 Siphamandla Mavanda
 Phumza Maweni
 Mark Mayambela
 Mihlali Mayambela
 Athi Mayinje
 Khanyisa Mayo
 Patrick Mayo
 Asavela Mbekile
 Mpho Mbiyozo
 Vuyo Mbotho
 Siya Mdaka
 Xolani Mdaki
 Luvuyo Memela
 Sinethemba Mjekula
 Sphelele Mkhulise
 Thembani Mkokeli
 Thabo Mngomeni
 Thando Mngomeni
 Kuselo Moyake
 Mihlali Mpafi
 Mihlali Mpongwana
 Zintle Mpupha
 Lubabalo Mtembu
 Dumani Mtya
 Lubabalo Mtyanda
 Lwazi Mvovo
 Buhle Mxunyelwa
 Bantu Mzwakali
 Welcome Ncita
 Ace Ncobo
 Bongani Ndulula
 Akona Ndungane
 Odwa Ndungane
 Mfuneko Ngam
 Anele Ngcongca (19872020) 
 Nkosi Nofuma
 Sipho Nofemele
 Thabo Nodada
 Jongi Nokwe
 Luyolo Nomandela
 Siyabonga Nontshinga
 Solo Nqweni
 Makhaya Ntini
 Thando Ntini
 Siphosakhe Ntiya-Ntiya
 Scarra Ntubeni
 Ntsikelelo Nyauza
 Sino Nyoka
 Sibusiso Papa
 Ayanda Patosi
 Zolani Petelo
 Siphesihle Punguzwa
 Luvuyo Pupuma
 Yaw Penxe 
 Sinethemba Qeshile
 Thabo September
 Malusi Siboto
 Ngazibini Sigwili
 Mzukisi Sikali
 Zithulele Sinqe
 Lutho Sipamla
 Siyabonga Siphika
 Zanele Situ
 Mkhanyiseli Siwahla
 Vukile Sofisa
 Kuhle Sonkosi
 Mzwandile Stick
 Zolani Tete
 Dingaan Thobela
 Mzuvukile Tom
 Siphiwe Tshabalala
 Thami Tsolekile
 Lonwabo Tsotsobe
 Nomsebenzi Tsotsobe
 Solly Tyibilika
 Simpiwe Vetyeka
 Lindokuhle Welemu
 Mandisa Williams
 Yanga Xakalashe
 Nkosiyabo Xakane
 Lundi Xhongo
 Xolile Yawa
 Mzolisi Yoyo
 Mzwanele Zito
 Masibusane Zongo

Actors, comedians, models, radio and TV personalities                              
 Masali Baduza
 Amanda Black
 Hlomla Dandala
 Nyaniso Dzedze
 Loyiso Gola
 Tina Jaxa
 Akhumzi Jezile (19892018) 
 Asanda Jezile
 Atandwa Kani
 John Kani
 Ama Qamata
 Timmy Kwebulana
 Loyiso Macdonald
 Sindiwe Magona
 Miriam Makeba
 Noxolo Maqashalala
 Senzeni Marasela
 Mac Mathunjwa
 Thembsie Matu
 Lusanda Mbane
 Masasa Mbangeni
 Hlubi Mboya
 Anele Mdoda
 Thembisa Mdoda
 Zenande Mfenyana
 Maxwell Mlilo
 Nambitha Mpumlwana
 Zandile Msutwana
 Vatiswa Ndara
 Brenda Ngxoli
 Trevor Noah 
 Zola Nombona
 Jet Novuka
 Nomhle Nkonyeni
 Tats Nkonzo
 Ray Ntlokwana
 Thoko Ntshinga
 Winston Ntshona
 Zimkhitha Nyoka
 Chumani Pan
 Thulisile Phongolo
 Soso Rungqu
 Luthando Shosha
 Washington Sixolo
 Zikhona Sodlaka
 Vusi Thanda
 Petronella Tshuma
 Zozibini Tunzi
 Nontsikelelo Veleko
 Zolisa Xaluva

Criminals
 Asande Baninzi
 Bulelani Mabhayi
 Simon Majola
 Nicholas Lungisa Ncama
 Velaphi Ndlangamandla
 Butana Almond Nofomela
 Khangayi Sedumedi
 Thozamile Taki
 Bulelani Vukwana

See also
List of current constituent African monarchs
List of people from the Eastern Cape
List of South African office-holders
List of South Africans
List of Southern Ndebele people
List of State leaders in the 20th century (1951–2000)
List of leaders of the TBVC states
List of Zulu people
Xhosa clan names
Xhosa language
Xhosa language newspapers
Xhosa people
Xhosa Wars

References

Xhosa

Xhosa